MT-ND5 is a gene of the mitochondrial genome coding for the NADH-ubiquinone oxidoreductase chain 5 protein (ND5). The ND5 protein is a subunit of NADH dehydrogenase (ubiquinone), which is located in the mitochondrial inner membrane and is the largest of the five complexes of the electron transport chain. Variations in human MT-ND5 are associated with mitochondrial encephalomyopathy, lactic acidosis, and stroke-like episodes (MELAS) as well as some symptoms of Leigh's syndrome and Leber's hereditary optic neuropathy (LHON).

Structure 
MT-ND5 is located in mitochondrial DNA from base pair 12,337 to 14,148. The MT-ND5 gene produces a 67 kDa protein composed of 603 amino acids. MT-ND5 is one of seven mitochondrial genes encoding subunits of the enzyme NADH dehydrogenase (ubiquinone), together with MT-ND1, MT-ND2, MT-ND3, MT-ND4, MT-ND4L, and MT-ND6. Also known as Complex I, this enzyme is the largest of the respiratory complexes. The structure is L-shaped with a long, hydrophobic transmembrane domain and a hydrophilic domain for the peripheral arm that includes all the known redox centres and the NADH binding site. MT-ND5 and the rest of the mitochondrially encoded subunits are the most hydrophobic of the subunits of Complex I and form the core of the transmembrane region.

Function 
The MT-ND5 product is a subunit of the respiratory chain Complex I that is supposed to belong to the minimal assembly of core proteins required to catalyze NADH dehydrogenation and electron transfer to ubiquinone (coenzyme Q10). Initially, NADH binds to Complex I and transfers two electrons to the isoalloxazine ring of the flavin mononucleotide (FMN) prosthetic arm to form FMNH2. The electrons are transferred through a series of iron-sulfur (Fe-S) clusters in the prosthetic arm and finally to coenzyme Q10 (CoQ), which is reduced to ubiquinol (CoQH2). The flow of electrons changes the redox state of the protein, resulting in a conformational change and pK shift of the ionizable side chain, which pumps four hydrogen ions out of the mitochondrial matrix.

Clinical Significance
A small percentage of mitochondrial encephalomyopathy, lactic acidosis, and stroke-like episodes (MELAS) are caused by a G>A mutation at base pair 13513 in the MT-ND5 gene. Mutations in the MT-ND5 gene cause impaired Complex I function of the mitochondrial electron transport system, impairing those tissues that require significant energy input, such as the brain and muscles. Cardiac and renal involvement as well as symptoms such as myopathy and lactic acidosis can also be observed. Those with MT-ND5 mutations can display the major features of MELAS and MERRF in some patients, as well as symptoms of Leigh's syndrome and/or Leber's hereditary optic neuropathy (LHON) in others.

Interactions 

MT-ND5 interacts with Glutamine synthetase (GLUL), LIG4 and YME1L1.

References

External links 
 Mass spectrometry characterization of MT-ND5 at COPaKB 
  GeneReviews/NCBI/NIH/UW entry on Mitochondrial DNA-Associated Leigh Syndrome and NARP

Proteins
Human mitochondrial genes